Ludwig Goldscheider (3 June 1896 – 26 June 1973) was an Austrian-British publisher, art historian, poet and translator who is known for founding the world-renowned Phaidon Press.

Biography 
Goldscheider was born in Vienna, then capital of the Austro-Hungarian Empire, to Wilhelm Goldscheider, a clockmaker from Galicia, and his first wife Julie (Itte) Goldscheider, née Lifschitz. After serving as an officer in the First World War, Goldscheider studied art history  at the University of Vienna under Julius von Schlosser, and began working in various publishing houses. His first book, Die Wiese ("The Meadow"), an anthology of lyric poetry, appeared in 1921.

Goldscheider co-founded Phaidon Press in 1923 under the German name Phaidon Verlag, with Béla Horovitz and Frederick "Fritz" Ungar. Phaidon Verlag became known throughout Europe for its inexpensive high-quality books about art and architecture. Goldschieder had a son with Muriel Breaks in 1941. The son's name is Jupiter 'Peter' Breaks, living in Mountain, Ontario, Canada.

Goldscheider emigrated to London in 1938 due to the Anschluss. He and Horovitz re-established the Phaidon Press in Britain, where they published, among many other art books, Ernst Gombrich's famous The Story of Art. Goldscheider stayed with the company for 35 years as author, editor and book-designer. After Horovitz's death Goldscheider took over general management of the company.

He was married to Blanca Goldscheider, sister-in-law of Elfriede Geiringer (wife of Otto Frank - father of Anne Frank).

Selected works 
 Michelangelo. Paintings, Sculpture, Architecture. Phaidon Press, London 1996, .
 Rodin. Sculptures. Phaidon Press, Oxford 1988, .
 Roman Portraits. Phaidon Press, London 2004, .
 Die schönsten Gedichte der Weltliteratur. Ein Hausbuch der Weltlyrik, von den Anfängen bis heute. Phaidon Verlag, Wien 1934
 Die Wiese. Gedichte. Amalthea-Verlag, Wien 1921.

His papers are held at the Getty Research Institute.

References

 Stadler, Friedrich (2004): Die vertriebene Vernunft. Emigration und Exil österreichischer Wissenschaft 1930–1940. LIT-Verlag, Münster
 2004, p. 528
 2004, p. 523–1106
 Wendland, Ulrike. (1999) Biographisches Handbuch deutschsprachiger Kunsthistoriker im Exil. Leben und Werk der unter dem Nationalsozialismus verfolgten und vertriebenen Wissenschaftler. Saur, München, Bd. 1, pp. 208–210

External links 
 Ludwig Goldscheider papers, finding aid for archive held at the Getty Research Institute. Includes biographical/ historic note.

1896 births
1973 deaths
Austrian Jews
Jewish emigrants from Austria to the United Kingdom after the Anschluss
Austrian publishers (people)
British publishers (people)
Austrian art historians
British art historians
Writers from Vienna
Austro-Hungarian military personnel of World War I
Anne Frank